Hovmantorp is the largest locality in Lessebo Municipality, Kronoberg County, Sweden, with 2,991 inhabitants in 2010. However, Hovmantorp is not the municipal seat, which is Lessebo.

Notable people from Hovmantorp 
Charlotte Perrelli
Truls Möregårdh

References

Populated places in Kronoberg County
Populated places in Lessebo Municipality
Värend